The Cyclo-cross Herentals is a cyclo-cross race held in Herentals, Belgium, which is part of the X²O Badkamers Trophy.

Past winners

References

Cycle races in Belgium
Cyclo-cross races
Recurring sporting events established in 2020
2020 establishments in Belgium
Herentals